Silverdale is a railway station on the Furness Line, which runs between  and . It is owned by Network Rail and managed by Northern Trains.

Facilities
There is no footbridge or underpass; passengers cross the line at track level via a barrow crossing (so disabled travellers are not recommended to use the southbound platform without assistance). The station buildings have been converted for residential use, but there are shelters on each side. There is a small car park. A ticket machine is available, so travellers can purchase tickets (or a permit to travel if not in possession of a credit or debit card) here prior to boarding. Train running information is provided via digital information displays and timetable posters.

The station is conveniently situated for visitors to Leighton Moss RSPB reserve, a few minutes' walk away, and Silverdale Golf Club, just across the road from the station. In June 2018, volunteers helped to set up a community-provided broadband link using the wifi from the nearby golf club and equipment supplied by Broadband for the Rural North (B4RN).

Services

Friends of Silverdale Station
In 2015, the Friends of Silverdale Station (FOSS) was founded, with the intention of improving and enhancing the station. The group has held working parties to tidy the platforms and plant flowerbeds, and hopes to restore the 1850s Furness Railway waiting room for community use.

References

External links
 
 

Railway stations in Lancaster
DfT Category F2 stations
Former Ulverston and Lancaster Railway stations
Railway stations in Great Britain opened in 1857
Northern franchise railway stations
1857 establishments in England